Tessa Appeldoorn (later Zwolle-Appeldoorn, born 29 March 1973) is a Dutch Olympic rower.

Appeldoorn was born in Utrecht in 1973. A silver medallist at the 2000 Summer Olympics in the Dutch women's eight, she was also in the women's eight in the 1996 Summer Olympics, finishing sixth. Appeldoorn also won World Championship bronze in the women's eight in 1995 and the women's coxless four in 1998.

She married fellow Dutch rower Henk-Jan Zwolle in October 1998.

References

1973 births
Living people
Dutch female rowers
Olympic medalists in rowing
Olympic rowers of the Netherlands
Rowers at the 1996 Summer Olympics
Rowers at the 2000 Summer Olympics
Sportspeople from Utrecht (city)
Medalists at the 2000 Summer Olympics
Olympic silver medalists for the Netherlands
World Rowing Championships medalists for the Netherlands
20th-century Dutch women
20th-century Dutch people
21st-century Dutch women